Chandrashekaran Menon, better known by his screen name Sankaradi (14 July 1924 – 8 October 2001), was an Indian actor. He was a veteran Malayalam comedian and character artist, who had over 700 Malayalam films to his credit. He dominated the Malayalam film scene in the 1960s, 1970s, and 1980s as a comedian along with Adoor Bhasi and Bahadoor. Later, he switched to character roles.

Early life
Sankaradi passed intermediate from Maharajas College, Ernakulam. Before entering films, Sankaradi briefly dabbled in politics, journalism and theatre. He had earlier joined the Indian National Congress, but later became a cardholder of the undivided Communist Party of India (CPI). However, he returned his party card after the CPI split in 1964 and turned to theatre.

Sankaradi joined the trade union movement at Baroda Railways while he was studying Marine engineering at Baroda. He abandoned his studies to pursue a job as a journalist in The Literary Review a newspaper based in Mumbai.

Film career
A stint in theatre in the mid-1960s in Kerala prepared Sankaradi for his foray into films. Since his debut in Kunchacko's Kadalamma, he remained an integral part of Malayalam cinema till his death.

In 1968, he acted in Viruthan Shanku, the first full-length comedy in Malayalam cinema directed by P. Venu. Sankaradi won the state's best character artiste award in 1969–71. He also holds the record for featuring in over 300 films with Prem Nazir.

Awards
Kerala State Film Awards:

Second Best Actor - 1970 - Vazhve mayam, Ezhuthatha Kadha
Second Best Actor - 1971 - Various Films

Personal life
He was born to Memana Parameswara Pillai and Chankaradiyil Thoppil Parambil Janaki Amma on 1924 at Cherai, Kochi, India. He had four siblings, Balan Menon, Sarojini, Lakshmikuty and Indira. Later on, he adopted the screen name 'Sankaradi' from the name of his Matrilineal family name "Chankaradiyil" by discarding the "-yil" and changing "Chankaradi" to "Sankaradi" 

Sankaradi remained a bachelor for a long time till he married Sharada in the late 1980s; the couple had no children. He was known throughout his film career by his house name(Tharavadu) "Sankaradi". He died at his home in Cherai at 10 PM on 8 October 2001, aged 77. He was ailing for a while until his death. He was cremated with full state honours at the premises of his home the next day. Harikrishnans, directed by Fazil, was his last film.

Filmography

Posthumus
The 2017 Malayalam film, Varnyathil Ashanka, directed by Sidharth Bharathan shows the reprisal of Sankaradi's character (photograph only), leftist idealogue, Kumara Pillai from Sandesham, along with his party worker Bobby Kottarakkara as Uthaman, and rival party chief Yashwanth Sahai (Innocent).

1990s

1980s

1970s

References

External links
 
 Sankaradi at MSI

1924 births
2001 deaths
Indian male film actors
Male actors from Kochi
Kerala State Film Award winners
Male actors in Malayalam cinema
20th-century Indian male actors
Indian male stage actors
Male actors in Malayalam theatre
21st-century Indian male actors
Malayalam comedians
Indian male comedians
20th-century comedians